Find My iPhone (known as Find My Mac in macOS) was an app and service provided by Apple Inc. that allowed remote locating of iOS devices, Mac computers, Apple Watch, and AirPods. Find My iPhone was enhanced and merged into the app Find My in iOS 13 and iPadOS 13 in 2019.

The service itself was integrated into iOS and macOS, while enabled devices could be tracked using either an iOS app or the iCloud website. On iOS 8 and older, the app could be downloaded from the App Store free of charge. Starting with iOS 9, the app has been bundled with the operating system.

For the app to work, both the tracker device and the device being located had to be supported devices with the Find My iPhone app installed and Location Services turned on, and both must have been connected to the same iCloud account.

Features 
Find My iPhone allowed users to locate their iOS devices using either the iOS app or iCloud on a computer (such as a desktop). In addition to locating a device, the service provided three additional options:

 Play sound – makes the device play a sound at maximum volume, makes flashing on screen even if it is muted. This feature is useful if the device has been mislaid, and is equivalent to finding a mislaid phone by calling it using another phone.
 Lost mode (iOS 6 or later) – flags the device as lost or stolen, allowing the user to lock it with a passcode. If the device is an iPhone and someone finds the device, they can call the user directly on the device.
 Erase iPhone – completely erases all content and settings, which is useful if the device contains sensitive information, but the device cannot be located after this action is performed. Starting with iOS 7 or later, after the erase is complete, the message can still be displayed and the device will be activation locked, blocking the activation of any device which has been restored in either DFU or Recovery mode without first disabling the Find My iPhone feature. Once the restore is completed, the device will ask for the Apple ID and password that has been previously associated with it to proceed, ultimately preventing any stolen device from being usable. An Apple ID password will be required to turn off Find My iPhone, sign out of iCloud, erase the device, or reactivate a device after a remote wipe.

The update with iOS 6 added the ability to check the device's battery level.

Requirements 
For the Find My iPhone app to work, the user must have to set up an iCloud account to create the user's Apple ID. Each device to be tracked must have been linked to the same Apple ID, and the Location Services feature must also have been turned on on each device to be tracked. Location was determined using GPS in the iOS device when Location Services are turned on, but the location of the iOS device was only approximate. To turn Location Services on, users needed to go to Settings > Privacy > Location Services, then selecting the Find My iPhone app in the list and selecting the "While Using the App" option. To deactivate the app, selecting the "Never" option instead. The user could also track the device by signing in to iCloud.com.

, Find My iPhone was supported on iPhone, iPad, iPod Touch, and Mac computers running OS X 10.7.5 "Lion" or later. In addition to a compatible device, a free iCloud account was required to use Find My iPhone. Users also can track their Find My iPhone enabled devices through iCloud on Windows, but cannot use it the other way around to track their PC.

History 
Find My iPhone was first announced on June 10, 2009, and released initially in June 2010 with the iOS 3.0 software update as a feature for paying MobileMe users. It was made free of charge with the iOS 4.2.1 software update on November 22, 2010, but only for devices introduced in 2010. With the release of iCloud in October 2011, the service became free for all users. Also, the service was made available as "Find My Mac" for Mac computers running OS X 10.7.2 "Lion" or later using iCloud.

In iOS 9, Find my iPhone became a built-in app, and thus could not be removed.

With the release of MacOS Catalina, the Find My Mac app was combined with the Find My Friends app to create the new Find My app.

Incidents
In July 2011, a Zurich woman had her backpack including an iPhone stolen. Police were able to recover it the same day after matching the GPS location with the address of a police-known petty criminal.
In November 2011, police in Los Angeles, California were able to find an armed robbery suspect by using Find My iPhone on the victim's stolen iPhone.
On September 14, 2012, two suspects were arrested in Atlanta, Georgia for robbing five women at gunpoint. Police were able to locate the suspects by using Find My iPhone to find one of the stolen iPhones.
Since early 2011, some Sprint users who used the app to find their lost device were sent to a 59-year-old man's house in Las Vegas, Nevada. Multiple people insisted that he had their device and the police were called multiple times. The man eventually had to put up a sign by his door saying that he had "no lost cell phones".
On January 16, 2015, a Langley, British Columbia woman had her iMac stolen during a break-in at her home. Nearly a month later, she received a notification on her phone then contacted police who found and arrested two men just as they were attempting to escape out a back door.
In November 2016, the husband of Sherri Papini located her cell phone and ear buds on a street corner, where his wife was allegedly kidnapped.

See also 
 AirTags
 Find My Device
 Find My Friends
 iCloud
 MobileMe

References

External links 
 
 
 

IOS software
IOS
Discontinued software
Internet geolocation